The consensus 1979 College Basketball All-American team, as determined by aggregating the results of four major All-American teams.  To earn "consensus" status, a player must win honors from a majority of the following teams: the Associated Press, the USBWA, The United Press International and the National Association of Basketball Coaches.

1979 Consensus All-America team

Individual All-America teams

AP Honorable Mention:

 Mark Aguirre, DePaul
 James Bailey, Rutgers
 Gene Banks, Duke
 Kim Belton, Stanford
 Rolando Blackman, Kansas State
 Roosevelt Bouie, Syracuse
 Brad Branson, SMU
 Michael Brooks, La Salle
 Matt Brown, Army
 Lawrence Butler, Idaho State
 Terence Carney, Pacific
 Sam Clancy, Pittsburgh
 Elbert Darden, Rice
 Larry Demic, Arizona
 Joe DeSantis, Fairfield
 Sammy Drummer, Georgia Tech
 Terry Duerod, Detroit
 Nikos Galis, Seton Hall
 Larry Gibson, Maryland
 Kim Goetz, San Diego State
 Michael Gray, Nevada
 Al Green, LSU
 Darrell Griffith, Louisville
 Brad Holland, UCLA
 Cheese Johnson, Wichita State
 Reggie Johnson, Tennessee
 Steve Johnson, Oregon State
 Albert King, Maryland
 Wayne Kreklow, Drake
 Jim Krivacs, Texas
 Jeff Lamp, Virginia
 Emmett Lewis, Colorado
 Kyle Macy, Kentucky
 Ollie Matson, Pepperdine
 John McCullough, Oklahoma
 Keith McDonald, Utah State
 Mike Niles, Cal State Fullerton
 Mike O'Koren, North Carolina
 Jim Paxson, Dayton
 Ron Perry, Holy Cross
 Tony Price, Penn
 Rick Raivio, Portland
 Kelvin Ransey, Ohio State
 Ricky Reed, Temple
 Cliff Robinson, USC
 Jeff Ruland, Iona
 DeWayne Scales, LSU
 Craig Shelton, Georgetown
 Jim Spanarkel, Duke
 John Stroud, Ole Miss
 Londale Theus, Santa Clara
 Bernard Toone, Marquette
 Darnell Valentine, Kansas
 Ronnie Valentine, Old Dominion
 Ren Watson, VCU
 Hawkeye Whitney, NC State
 Herb Williams, Ohio State
 Rudy Woods, Texas A&M

Academic All-Americans
On March 21, 1979, CoSIDA announced the 1979 Academic All-America team.  The following is the 1978–79 Academic All-America Men's Basketball Team as selected by CoSIDA:

See also
 1978–79 NCAA Division I men's basketball season

References

NCAA Men's Basketball All-Americans
All-Americans